Swiss Institute / Contemporary Art New York (SI) is an independent non-profit contemporary art organization founded in 1986. SI is located at 38 St Marks Pl, the corner of Second Avenue and St Marks Place in the East Village neighborhood of Manhattan.

History
The Swiss Institute was founded in 1986 by a group of Swiss expats looking to highlight their country’s artists and culture. It originally had headquarters at the Swiss Townhouse at 35 West Sixty-seventh Street. It moved to the third floor of the New Era Building at 495 Broadway in Soho in 1994.

From 2011 to 2016, the Swiss Institute was located in a  space at 18 Wooster Street. During that time, it showed its inaugural design exhibition in 2014. In addition to hosting art exhibitions, the space became the venue for the fall/winter 2016 presentation of New York City-based accessories brand Mansur Gavriel, which enlisted a handful of collaborators to turn the space into a domestic scene. 

From 2016, the Swiss Institute staged shows at Swiss In Situ, a temporary  space at 102 Franklin Street in TriBeCa.

Since 2018, the Swiss Institute has been located in a  space at 38 St. Marks Place and Second Avenue. Formerly a bank, the four-story building was re-designed by Selldorf Architects and includes exhibition space, an education and public programs floor, a library, and a usable rooftop. Exhibitions include visual and performing arts, design, and architecture, with public programs spanning a wide range of topics. SI also has weekly public programming and education classes. Admission is free.

Printed Matter, Inc. St. Mark’s bookstore is located on the ground floor.

Leadership

Directors
 1987–1992: Ziba Ardalan
 1992–1997: Carin Kuoni
 1997–2000: Annette Schindler
 2000–2006: Marc-Olivier Wahler
 2006–2013: Gianni Jetzer
 2013–2021: Simon Castets
 2022–present: Stefanie Hessler

Chairs of the Board
 2002–2016: Fabienne Abrecht
 2016–present: Maja Hoffmann

Awards
At its annual fundraiser, the Swiss Institute has recognized several individuals with the SI Award, including the following:
 1996: Bob Lutz
 1997: Daniel Vasella
 1998: Leonard Lauder
 2000: Ulrich Bremi
 2001: Adolf Ogi
 2003: Michael Ringier
 2005: Thomas W. Bechtler
 2006: Uli Sigg
 2007: Iwan Wirth
 2008: Maja Hoffmann
 2009: Bice Curiger
 2010: Sam Keller
 2011: Hans-Ulrich Obrist
 2012: Eric Syz
 2014: Ursula Hauser
 2015: Dominique Lévy
 2016: Eva Presenhuber
 2017: Yves Béhar
 2018: Herzog & de Meuron

Since 2003, the Swiss Institute has also been honoring artists with the SI Artist Tributes:
 2003: Christian Marclay
 2004: Ugo Rondinone
 2005: Olaf Breuning
 2006: Christoph Büchel
 2007: Shirana Shahbazi
 2008: Roman Signer
 2009: Peter Fischli & David Weiss
 2010: Pipilotti Rist
 2011: John Armleder
 2012: Thomas Hirschhorn
 2013: Sylvie Fleury
 2014: Valentin Carron
 2015: Pamela Rosenkranz
 2016: Olivier Mosset, Jordan Wolfson
 2017: Mai-Thu Perret, Niele Toroni
 2018: Latifa Echakhch, Walter Pfeiffer
 2019: Christina Forrer, Rudolf Stingel
 2021: Jill Mulleady, Nicolas Party

References

External links
 
 Swiss Institute / Contemporary Art New York at Google Cultural Institute

Art museums and galleries in Manhattan
Contemporary art galleries in the United States
East Village, Manhattan
1986 establishments in New York City